Derby is a surname. Notable people with the surname include:

 Alfred Thomas Derby (1821–1873) English painter, son of William Derby
 Brown Derby (actor) (1914-2000), Scottish actor
 Dean Derby (born 1935), American retired National Football League player
 Ethel Roosevelt Derby (1891-1977), youngest daughter of President Theodore Roosevelt, instrumental in preserving his legacy
 Elias Hasket Derby (1739-1799), American merchant
 Fred Derby (1940-2001), Surinamese politician and trade unionist
 George Derby (1823-1861), American humorist
 George Derby (baseball) (1857-1925), American Major League Baseball pitcher
 James Cephas Derby (1818-1892), American book publisher
 Orville Adalbert Derby (1851-1915), American geologist who worked in Brazil
 Pat Derby (1942–2013), British-born American animal trainer
 Sylvester Derby (1892–1974), American college football head coach
 William Derby (1786–1847) English portraitist, miniature painter and copyist, father of Alfred Thomas Derby

See also
 John de Derby, Archdeacon of Barnstaple and Dean of Lichfield from 1355 to 1358
 Alchmund of Derby (d. c. 800), Anglo-Saxon saint
 Derby (disambiguation)